The following squads were selected for the 2020 Under-19 Cricket World Cup.

Afghanistan
Afghanistan's squad was announced on 8 December 2019.
 Farhan Zakhil (c)
 Noor Ahmad
 Sediqullah Atal
 Shafiqullah Ghafari
 Fazalhaq Farooqi
 Imran Mir
 Jamshid Miralikhil
 Abid Mohammadi
 Mohammad Ishaq (wk)
 Asif Musazai
 Abdul Rahman
 Abidullah Taniwal
 Ibrahim Zadran
 Rahmanullah
 Zohaib

Australia
Australia's squad was announced on 13 December 2019. Initially, Australia did not name a captain of their squad, however Mackenzie Harvey was officially named as the team captain just ahead of their opening match.

 Mackenzie Harvey (c)
 Cooper Connolly
 Oliver Davies
 Sam Fanning
 Jake Fraser-McGurk
 Lachlan Hearne
 Corey Kelly
 Liam Marshall
 Todd Murphy
 Patrick Rowe
 Tanveer Sangha
 Liam Scott
 Bradley Simpson
 Connor Sully
 Matthew Willans

Bangladesh
Bangladesh's squad was announced on 21 December 2019. Ahead of the Super League quarterfinal, Mrittunjoy Chowdhury was ruled out of Bangladesh's squad, with Meherob Hasan named as his replacement.

 Akbar Ali (c)
 Towhid Hridoy (vc)
 Shahin Alam
 Mrittunjoy Chowdhury
 Avishek Das
 Parvez Hossain Emon
 Meherob Hasan
 Rakibul Hasan
 Tanzid Hasan
 Mahmudul Hasan Joy
 Shahadat Hossain
 Shamim Hossain
 Shoriful Islam
 Hasan Murad
 Prantik Nawrose Nabil
 Tanzim Hasan Sakib

Canada
Canada's squad was announced on 18 December 2019.

 Ashtan Deosammy (c)
 Harmandeep Singh Bedi
 Benjamin Calitz
 Arshdeep Dhaliwal
 Gurjot Gosal
 Rishiv Joshi
 Muhammad Kamal
 Akhil Kumar
 Nicholas Manohar
 Mihir Patel
 Randhir Sandhu
 Eshan Sensarma
 Raqib Shamsudeen
 Ayush Verma
 Udaybir Walia

England
England's squad was announced on 23 December 2019.

India
India's squad was announced on 2 December 2019. On 10 January 2020, Divyansh Joshi was ruled out of India's squad due to an injury, with Siddhesh Veer named as his replacement.
 Priyam Garg (c)
 Dhruv Jurel (vc, wk)
 Atharva Ankolekar
 Ravi Bishnoi
 Shubhang Hegde
 Yashasvi Jaiswal
 Divyansh Joshi
 Kumar Kushagra (wk)
 Sushant Mishra
 Vidyadhar Patil
 Shashwat Rawat
 Divyaansh Saxena
 Akash Singh
 Kartik Tyagi
 Tilak Varma
 Siddhesh Veer

Japan
Japan's squad was announced on 6 December 2019.

 Marcus Thurgate (c, wk)
 Neel Date (vc)
 Maximilian Clements
 Tushar Chaturvedi
 Kento Ota-Dobell
 Ishaan Fartyal
 Sora Ichiki
 Leon Mehlig
 Masato Morita
 Shu Noguchi
 Yugandhar Retharekar
 Debashish Sahoo
 Reiji Suto
 Kazumasa Takahashi
 Ashley Thurgate

New Zealand
New Zealand's squad was announced on 12 December 2019.

 Jesse Tashkoff (c)
 Adithya Ashok
 Kristian Clarke
 Hayden Dickson
 Joey Field
 David Hancock
 Simon Keene
 Fergus Lellman
 Nicholas Lidstone
 Rhys Mariu
 William O'Rourke
 Ben Pomare
 Quinn Sunde
 Beckham Wheeler-Greenall
 Oliver White

Nigeria
Nigeria's squad was announced on 7 December 2019.

 Sylvester Okpe (c)
 Mohameed Taiwo (vc)
 Rasheed Abolarin
 Peter Aho
 Miracle Akhigbe
 Shehu Audu
 Oche Boniface
 Isaac Danladi
 Miracle Ikaige
 Akhere Isesele
 Abdulrahman Jimoh
 Samuel Mba
 Olayinka Olaleye
 Sulaimon Runsewe
 Ifeanyichukwu Uboh

Pakistan
Pakistan's squad was announced on 6 December 2019. On 31 December 2019, Naseem Shah was withdrawn from the squad, after an impressive start in Test cricket, with Mohammad Wasim named as his replacement.

 Rohail Nazir (c, wk)
 Haider Ali (vc)
 Abbas Afridi
 Qasim Akram
 Aamir Ali
 Arish Ali Khan
 Abdul Bangalzai
 Mohammad Haris
 Fahad Munir
 Mohammad Huraira
 Tahir Hussain
 Irfan Khan
 Mohammad Amir Khan
 Naseem Shah
 Muhammad Shehzad
 Mohammad Wasim

Scotland
Scotland's squad was announced on 13 December 2019. Ahead of the tournament, Durness Mackay-Champion was ruled out of Scotland's squad, with Lyle Robertson named as his replacement.

 Angus Guy (c)
 Daniel Cairns
 Jamie Cairns
 Jasper Davidson
 Ben Davidson
 Sean Fischer-Keogh
 Callum Grant
 Rory Hanley
 Tom Mackintosh
 Durness Mackay-Champion
 Euan McBeth
 Liam Naylor
 Charlie Peet
 Lyle Robertson
 Kess Sajjad
 Uzzair Shah

South Africa
South Africa's squad was announced on 10 December 2019.

 Bryce Parsons (c)
 Khanya Cotani (vc)
 Luke Beaufort
 Jonathan Bird
 Merrick Brett
 Achille Cloete
 Gerald Coetzee
 Tyrese Karelse
 Mondli Khumalo
 Jack Lees
 Andrew Louw
 Levert Manje
 Odirile Modimokoane
 Pheko Moletsane
 Tiaan van Vuuren

Sri Lanka
Sri Lanka's squad was announced on 6 January 2020.

 Nipun Dananjaya (c)
 Ashian Daniel
 Sonal Dinusha
 Thaveesha Kahaduwaarachchi
 Dilshan Madushanka
 Kamil Mishara
 Kavindu Nadeeshan
 Navod Paranavithana
 Matheesha Pathirana
 Ravindu Rasantha
 Mohammed Shamaaz
 Amshi de Silva
 Dilum Sudeera
 Ahan Wickramasinghe

United Arab Emirates
The UAE's squad was announced on 10 December 2019.

 Aryan Lakra (c)
 Vriitya Aravind
 Deshan Chethyia
 Muhammad Farazuddin
 Jonathan Figy
 Syed Haider
 Osama Hassan
 Palaniapan Meiyappan
 Rishabh Mukherjee
 Ali Naseer
 Alishan Sharafu
 Sanchit Sharma
 Kai Smith
 Akasha Tahir
 Ansh Tandon

West Indies
The West Indies' squad was announced on 25 November 2019.

 Kimani Melius (c)
 Kelvon Anderson
 Daniel Beckford
 Matthew Forde
 Joshua James
 Mbeki Joseph
 Leonardo Julien
 Avinash Mahabirsingh
 Kirk McKenzie
 Antonio Morris
 Ashmead Nedd
 Matthew Patrick
 Jayden Seales
 Ramon Simmonds
 Nyeem Young

Zimbabwe
Zimbabwe's squad was announced on 8 December 2019. Ahead of the tournament, Brandon James was ruled out of Zimbabwe's squad, with Sukhemuzi Ndlela named as his replacement.
 Dion Myers (c)
 Wesley Madhevere (vc)
 Emmanuel Bawa
 Privilege Chesa
 Gareth Chirawu
 Ahomed Rameez Ebrahim
 Dylan Grant
 Brandon James
 Tadiwanashe Marumani
 Sukhemuzi Ndlela
 Tadiwanashe Nyangani
 Luke Oldknow
 Samuel Ruwisi
 Dane Schadendorf
 Milton Shumba
 Taurayi Tugwete

References

2020
Squads